Modern Times Revive is the fifth studio album by Dutch rock and roll and blues group Herman Brood & His Wild Romance. The Wild Romance fell apart after Go Nutz and Wait a Minute; the "new" Wild Romance featured David Hollestelle on guitar. The album was produced by Rinus Gerritsen of Golden Earring.

The album was re-released on CD in 1995 by Sony BMG/Ariola.

Track listing

Personnel
Herman Brood - piano, keyboards, vocals
Bertus Borgers - saxophone
Freddy Cavalli - bass
David Hollestelle - guitar
Anthony Del Monte Lyon - drums
Dee Dee - vocals
Bert Hansen - harmonica
George Kooymans - guitar
Dany Lademacher - guitar
Wally Langdon - bass
Gino Vain - bass
Rinus Gerritsen - producer

References 

1981 albums
Herman Brood & His Wild Romance albums